The ZZR1400 or  Kawasaki Ninja ZX-14  and ZX-14R (2006–2022), is a motorcycle in the Ninja sport bike series from the Japanese manufacturer Kawasaki that was their most powerful sport bike as of 2006. It was introduced at the 2005 Tokyo Motor Show and released for the 2006 model year as a replacement for the Kawasaki ZZ-R1200 (2002-2005). The ZZR1400 is capable of accelerating from 0–60 mph in 2.5 seconds.

The motorcycle was in season 10 of Fifth Gear on October 30, 2006.

Motorcycle USA road tested the bike in its October 10, 2006 issue and posted the following stock results:
 60 ft.: 1.713 seconds
 330 ft.: 4.349 seconds
 1/8 mile: 6.447 seconds, achieving 117.39 mph
 1/4 mile: 9.783 seconds, achieving 147.04 mph

2008 saw a minor update. The launch of the 2012 ZX-14R saw a second-generation revision with the R designation. This included a displacement increase to produce more horsepower along with two variable power modes, Kawasaki traction control, and an ignition-management system that was lifted from the ZX-10R.  It received cosmetic updates, incremental chassis upgrades, and suspension revised internals and a slipper clutch added for the first time. The new motor had cylinder heads with polished ports and cams with more lift and longer duration.  Pistons made were lighter with added compression, cooled by a new oil jet system. Connecting rods and crankshaft were strengthened, as were the tensioner and cam chain, while the transmission got heat-treated surface gears.  In an effort to make the motorcycle run cooler, and therefore be more durable, they added a second radiator fan. Larger head pipes and larger mufflers with a less restrictive air filter improved response.  Motorcyclist recorded Rickey Gadson's quarter mile time of 9.64 seconds at 149.83 mph from a bone-stock bike, on a 50-degree morning, at an altitude of 2100 feet.  Cycle World recorded a quarter-mile time of a record 9.47-seconds (corrected) at 152.83 mph, and also hit 60 mph in just 2.6 sec.

See also 
List of fastest production motorcycles by acceleration

References

External links 
 (United States)

Ninja ZX-14
Sport bikes
Motorcycles introduced in 2006